Barbara Ann Brennan (February 19, 1939 – October 3, 2022) was an American author, spiritual healer, businesswoman and teacher working in the field of energy healing. In 2011, she was listed by the Watkins Review as the 94th most spiritually influential person in the world.

Education and early career 

Brennan received a Bachelor of Science degree in Physics in 1962 from the University of Wisconsin–Madison, and two years later received her Masters in Atmospheric Physics from the same institution. She then went on to spend six years working at NASA's Goddard Space Flight Center. From 1970, she participated in courses at a number of unaccredited institutions, offering courses in the "human energy field".  She completed a two–year program in Therapeutic Counselling at the Community of the Whole Person in Washington, D.C., followed by a three-year program in Core Energetics at the Institute for Core Energetics in New York City in 1978 and a five-year program in Spiritual Healership at the Phoenicia Pathwork Center in Phoenicia, New York in 1979.  She was strongly influenced by Eva and John Pierrakos, who founded a system for self-transformation called the Pathwork, drawing on the ideas of Wilhelm Reich and Alexander Lowen. Brennan worked with the Pierrakos, and became a Pathwork Helper and Core Energetics therapist. Brennan also took seminars with and was influenced by Rev. Rosalyn L. Bruyere. She developed her own private healing practice in 1977 and then established a training programme to teach others. Brennan had a PhD in philosophy from Greenwich University in Australia and DTh in theology from Holos University, both earned in 2001. These universities are unaccredited.

Ideas and theories 

Her first book, Hands of Light: A Guide to Healing Through the Human Energy Field, is considered a "classic" in the field of spiritual healing, with reputedly over one million copies in print in 22 languages. Brennan claimed to receive intuitive information about her clients during sessions, and to see repetitive patterns in the energy fields of her clients indicating common roots underlying their difficulties. Brennan's books contain drawings of auras and energy fields, and descriptions of how human energy fields interact with each other.  She popularized a seven-layer model of the energy field, each layer being structured of differing frequencies and kinds of energy and performing different functions. Brennan viewed the chakras as transformers that receive and process universal energy, as well as enabling expression and healthy functioning of the individual's own consciousness and psycho-physical make-up. She was best known for taking a methodical approach to energy healing.

Brennan created a type of energy healing techniques that she called "full spectrum healing" to work on the seven layers of the human energy field or auras. Brennan claimed that the technique she called spiritual surgery works on the fifth level of the human energy field using the power of a spirit surgeon.

Brennan's concept of "hara" 
In her second book, Light Emerging, Brennan expanded her model of human subtle energies by adding the dimension of "intentionality" called "hara". Hara holds the human body in material manifestation until the life purpose is fulfilled. When the hara is healthy, the individual acts naturally and effortlessly to fulfill his or her life purpose. The hara is the foundation for the human energy field (HEF), or aura. Because of this relationship, healing hara is considered especially powerful for healing the auric field and, thereby, the physical body.

She also talked about the corestar. Our individual divinity, one with the universal divinity.

Barbara Brennan School of Healing 

In 1982, she closed her private practice in New York City and established the Barbara Brennan School of Healing (BBSH), designed to train professional healers from around the world. The school has been located in Florida since 2000, and is licensed by the State of Florida Commission for Independent Education. In 2003, Brennan opened the Barbara Brennan School of Healing Europe (BBSHE), originally in Mondsee, Austria which then moved to Bad Neuenahr near Bonn, Germany in 2006 and moved back to Austria to the small town of Bad Ischl in 2008. BBSHE closed in 2015. In 2007, a new branch opened in Tokyo, Japan, which subsequently closed in 2010.  Barbara Brennan School has 2700 graduates worldwide, over 224 teachers, and 188 Brennan Integration Practitioners.  Brennan Healing Science Professionals continue to teach her work in Florida with plans of a global expansion in the near future.  The Barbara Brennan School of Healing offers both a nonaccredited BA degree in Brennan Healing Science and a Brennan Healing Science certificate.

Death
The Barbara Brennan School of Healing reported her death on October 3, 2022.

Publications 

Hands of Light: A Guide to Healing through the Human Energy Field, Bantam, 1987. ,    limited free access
Light Emerging: The Journey of Personal Healing, Bantam, 1993. ,   limited free access
Core light healing: My Personal Journey and Advanced Healing Concepts for Creating the Life You Long to Live

See also 
Terms and concepts in alternative medicine
Body psychotherapy
Energy (esotericism)
Energy medicine
Bioenergetics
Jin Shin Do
Johrei
Reiki

References

External links
 Barbara Brennan's website

1939 births
2022 deaths
Channellers
New Age writers
New Thought writers
American spiritual writers
Folk healers
University of Wisconsin–Madison College of Letters and Science alumni
Place of birth missing